Jean-Marie-Edmond Sabran (21 February 1908, Hyères, Var – 19 January 1994, Paris), best known by his pseudonym Paul Berna, was a French writer whose children's books were also published in Britain and the United States.

Before becoming a full-time writer, he worked on a suburban newspaper. After publishing several books under his own name, from 1952 he wrote children's books under the pseudonym Paul Berna. His books were published by Rouge et Or, the publishing house where his brother Guy Sabran worked as an illustrator. The brothers collaborated on Zoupette en camping, Les Contes des mille et une nuits and Nous irons à Lunaterra.

His most famous book, Le Cheval sans tête, usually known in English as A Hundred Million Francs, was published in 1955. It concerns the adventures of a gang of street urchins from the slums of Paris whose plaything, a headless horse on wheels, is used as a hiding-place by train robbers. It has been translated into several languages, enjoying great success in Britain and the United States. In 1963, the Disney Studios in Britain filmed the book as The Horse Without a Head: The 100,000,000 Franc Train Robbery, scripted by T. E. B. Clarke and starring Jean-Pierre Aumont and Herbert Lom.

The Mystery of the Cross-eyed Man was read on Jackanory in 1968 by Keith Barron.

Paul Berna also wrote science fiction novels, the best known being La Porte des étoiles (Threshold of the Stars) and its sequel Le Continent du Ciel (Continent in the Sky).

For his adult novels he used the pseudonyms Bernard Deleuze and Paul Gerrard, and for detective fiction, Joel Audrenn.

In 1958, Jean Sabran married Jany Saint-Marcoux, herself an author of Rouge et Or books for children.

At the end of his life he suffered from blindness.

Works in translation 
 Threshold of the Stars (La Porte des étoiles), 1954
 Continent in the Sky (Le Continent du ciel), 1955
 A Hundred Million Francs (Le Cheval sans tête), 1955
 The Street Musician (Le Piano à bretelle), 1956
 The Knights of King Midas (Millionnaires en herbe), 1958
 Flood Warning (La Grande Alerte), 1960
 The Mystery of Saint Salgue (La Piste du souvenir), 1962
 The Clue of the Black Cat (Le Témoignage du chat noir), 1963
 The Mystery of the Cross-Eyed Man (Les Pèlerins de Chiberta), 1965
 Magpie Corner (Le Carrefour de la Pie), 1966
 The Mule on the Motorway aka The Mule on the Expressway (Le Commissaire Sinet et le mystère de l'autoroute du sud), 1967
 A Truckload of Rice (Le Commissaire Sinet et le mystère des poissons rouges), 1968
 The Secret of the Missing Boat (L'Epave de la Bérénice), 1969
 They Didn't Come Back (Un Pays sans légende), 1969
 Myna Bird Mystery (L'Opération oiseau-noir), 1970
 Gaby and the New Money Fraud (Le Bout du monde), 1971
 Vagabonds of the Pacific (Les Vagabonds du Pacifique), 1973
 The Vagabonds Ashore (La Grande nuit de Mirabal), 1973

As Bernard Deleuze
 Vagabond of the Andes (Vagabond des Andes) (1953)
 The Vengeance of Don Manuel (1953)

References

Encyclopædia Britannica
New York Times obituary
Internet Book List

1908 births
1994 deaths
People from Hyères
French children's writers
French science fiction writers
20th-century French novelists
20th-century French male writers
French male novelists